The 1945 Calgary Stampeders season was the first season for the team under the name "Stampeders" (They were previously known as the "Bronks") and their seventh overall. There was no regular season play in 1945. The W.I.F.U. suspended operations during World War II and did not return to action until the 1945 playoffs.

The Stampeders were defeated in the W.I.F.U. Finals by the Winnipeg Blue Bombers.

Regular season
During the Second World War, The W.I.F.U. decided to cancel its 1942 to 1945 seasons. However, in 1945, the war was over and the W.I.F.U. decided to hold playoffs for the year of 1945 despite the fact that no regular season games were played. All W.I.F.U. teams were automatically entered into the 1945 playoffs.

Playoffs

FINALS

Winnipeg advances to the Grey Cup game.

References

Calgary Stampeders seasons
1945 Canadian football season by team